is a Japanese fashion magazine published by Kodansha. It is published in Japan, China, Taiwan, Hong Kong, and Thailand.

History and profile
Vivi was first published in May 1983. The target age group are teens and young women 17–27 years old, with the main demographic of readers being college students and young office ladies.

The magazine's cover queen' is Namie Amuro, who has been featured on the cover the greatest number of times. Other artists frequently featured on the cover include Ayumi Hamasaki and Kumi Koda.

In Taiwan, Vivi is published in Chinese language.

The circulation of Vivi was 286,039 copies in 2010 and 234,370 copies in 2011.

ViVi models 
These models are regularly employed by ViVi magazine.

Current

 Maria Tani (ja)
 Miu
 Sachi Fujii (ja)
 Seika Furuhata
 Nicole Fujita
 Erika Murakami
 Sakura Arianna
 Lina Arashi (ja)
 Ten Yamasaki (ja)
 Yuna Bridgman
 Seira

Previous

 Nanako Matsushima
 Mizuho Koga (ja)
 Sayo Aizawa
 Tomoko Yamaguchi
 Seri Iwahori (ja)
 Mayumi Sada
 Noriko Nakagoshi
 Mayu Gamō
 Megumi Mikimoto (ja)
 Yuri Iwata (ja)
 Aki Hatada (ja)
 Sachi Suzuki (ja)
 Jelly
 Maya Stenken
 Yurie (ja)
 Saya Ichikawa
 Naomi Ozawa (ja)
 Malia
 Camilla
 Kana Oya
 Jun Hasegawa
 Marie (ja)
 Kiko Mizuhara
 Chikako Watanabe (ja)
 Keiko Wakita (ja)
 Mayuko Arisue
 Lena Fujii
 Mary Sara
 Elli Rose (ja)
 Mitsuki Oishi
 Yukina Kinoshita
 Maggy
 Mai Miyagi
 Yui Sakuma
 Rola
 Kazunyolo
 Mayuko Kawakita
 Reina Triendl
 Tina Tamashiro
 Emma Jasmine (ja)
 Eri Tachibana (ja)
 Emma (ja)
 Alissa Yagi

Serial 
　　　The magazine features regular appearances by ViVi models and a monthly series of articles by popular singers of the readers' generation.

Current 

 Shin Ten chi (New world） by Ten Yamasaki
 Nikoholi by Nicole Fujita

 Fashion Geek by Seira

Previous 

 Lena Likes by Rina Fujii
 TOMO'S DIARY by Tomomi Itano
 Mitsuki no hutû ga itiban (Mitsuki's normal is the Best) by Mitsuki Oishi
 EXO-SHOT by EXO
 Ayu no dezidezi nikki (AYU'S DIGIDIGI Diary) by Ayumi Hamasaki
 Katô miriya no fassyonn syô (Miliya Kato's Fashion Show) by Miliya Kato
 Shifuku tekina Yukina （Yukina like a private outfit）by Yukina Kinoshita
 Hamarindoru by Reina Triendl 
 Beauty Muse (also appears in other magazines of the company such as "with") by Hinako Sano
 BOUNCE TWICE by TWICE
 Reina no naretara iina (Raina wishes she could be) by Reina Triendl 
 P's STYLE by Tomohisa Yamashita
 Yagi no ota biyou (Yagi is a beauty geek)  by Arisa Yagi
 Moderu x Moderu zine ( Models × Models zine) by ViVi models

References

External links
Net ViVi Japanese website
昕薇《ViVi》 Chinese website

1983 establishments in Japan
Chinese-language magazines
Kodansha magazines
Fashion magazines published in Japan
Magazines established in 1983
Magazines published in Tokyo
Monthly magazines published in Japan
Women's magazines published in Japan